Crocodile Love is the final studio album from Juluka, a South African band led by Johnny Clegg and Sipho Mchunu. It was first released in 1997.  It was entitled Ya Vuka Inkunzi - The Bull has Risen in South Africa.

Track listing 

Love Is Just A Dream (Tatazela)  
Crocodile Love 
Tholakele 
My Big Lady (Studla Sami) 
Isoka Lizo Kuthatha 
Journey's End (Emalonjeni) 
Umuzi Wami 
Circle Of Light 
Thandazani 
Ubaba Akalele 
Makhelwane 
Crocodile Love (remix) 
Crocodile Love (extended remix) 
Laduma (South Africa World Cup Anthem)

The last three tracks did not appear on Ya Vuka Inkunzi.

External links
 Crocodile Love - on the Juluka website

Juluka albums
1997 albums